Sooranad Ravi (1943 February 7 - 2018 October 24) is a Malayalam language children's literature writer and translator from Kerala, India. He has authored over a hundred works in Malayalam literature, including short stories, poems and translations.

Biography
He was born on February 7, 1943, at Sooranad, Kollam district to Ichakkattu Idayileveettil Paramupillai and Bhavaniamma. He was a teacher at Mannady High School and retired in 1998. He was a follower of Kerala renaissance leader Chattampi Swamikal. His works, which include short poems and stories for children, have been a regular feature in children's magazines.

Works

Novels and Short story collections
Ariyunda
Onappanthu
Kilippattukal
Bhagyathilekkulla Vazhi (Meaning:The way to luck)
Pongalpattu
Aksharamuthu
Kathakal kond Bhoomi chuttam (Meaning:Let's go around the world with stories)
Sachthra buddha kathakal (Illustrated Buddhist stories)Kuttikalkkay 101 kathakal (101 stories for children)
TranslationsPonnarinjal kathaSreebuddhan, Asiayute velicham (translation of Edwin Arnold's 'Light of Asia')Kshemendra's BodhisathwapadannakalpathaGandjijiyute dayari (Gandhi's diary)101 Red Indian Nadodikkathakal (Translation of 101 Red Indian Folk Tales)Tamizh nadodikkathakal (Translation of Tamil folk tales)Indian nadodikkathakal (Translation of Indian folk tales)Telugukathakal (Translation of Telugu storiesTanjavoorile tharattuppattukal (Translation of ballads of Thanjavur)Thirupati Venkitesa kathakal (Translation of stories of Tirupati Venkatesh)Subala vajrathundam (Translation of Sanskrit play)Gandhijiyute andhya prabhashanangal (Translation of Gandhiji's Last Sermons)Oru Kadalora gramathinte kathaCharukasera Translation of Sreemad Bhagavadgita by Kodungallur Kunjikkuttan Thampuran
Translation of Thampuran Ramayanam by Kottarakkara Thampuran

Awards and honors
1989: NCERT National Award for Children's literature for his work Ariyunda''
2018: Kerala State Institute of Children's Literature Outstanding Contribution Award for his contributions in the field of children's literature

Family
He and his wife Chembakutty Amma have 3 children Indusekhar, Srirekha and Sreelakshmi.

References

1943 births
2018 deaths
Malayalam-language writers
Indian children's writers
People from Kollam district
Writers from Kollam